Ragadia is a genus of brush-footed butterflies (family Nymphalidae). This genus is one of those commonly called ringlets.

Species
 Ragadia annulata
 Ragadia crisilda - striped ringlet
 Ragadia critias
 Ragadia crito
 Ragadia critolaus
 Ragadia crohonica
 Ragadia luzonia
 Ragadia maganda
 Ragadia makuta
 Ragadia melindena

References
 "Ragadia Westwood, [1851]" at Markku Savela's Lepidoptera and Some Other Life Forms

Ragadiini
Butterfly genera
Taxa named by John O. Westwood